The 4th Canadian Film Awards were presented on April 27, 1952 to honour achievements in Canadian film. The ceremony was hosted by Sidney Earle Smith, the president of the University of Toronto.

Winners

Films
Film of the Year: Newfoundland Scene: A Tale of Outport Adventure — Crawley Films, F. R. Crawley producer and director
Theatrical Feature Length (Documentary): Royal Journey — National Film Board of Canada, Tom Daly producer, David Bairstow, Gudrun Parker, Roger Blais directors
Honourable Mention: La petite Aurore, l'enfant martyre (Little Aurore's Tragedy) — L'Alliance Cinematographique Canadienne, Jean-Yves Bigras director
Theatrical Short: Opera School — National Film Board of Canada, Guy Glover producer, Gudrun Parker director
Honourable Mention: The Fruitful Earth — Associated Screen Studios, Bernard Norrish producer, Gordon Sparling director
Honourable Mention: The Man in the Peace Tower — National Film Board of Canada, Sydney Newman producer, Roger Blais director
Honourable Mention: Struggle for Oil — National Film Board of Canada, Sydney Newman producer, Ronald Dick director
Non-Theatrical, Open: Newfoundland Scene: A Tale of Outport Adventure — Crawley Films, F. R. Crawley producer and director
Honourable Mention: The Longhouse People — National Film Board of Canada, Tom Daly producer, Allan Wargon director
Honourable Mention: Les moines de Saint-Benoît (Monastery) — National Film Board of Canada, Guy Glover producer, Roger Blais director
Non-Theatrical, Government Sponsored: Milk-Made — National Film Board of Canada, Michael Spencer producer, Larry Gosnell director
Honourable Mention: Ski à Québec — Université Laval, Abbé Maurice Proulx producer
Non-Theatrical, Non-Government Sponsored: Packaged Power — Crawley Films, Quentin Brown producer
Amateur: A Camper and His Canoe — David Palter producer and director
Honourable Mention: Cours primaire de français — French Ciné Club, University of Toronto
Honourable Mention: Story of a Georgian Coffee Pot — Victoria, B.C. Movie Club, Douglas Flintoff director

Special Award: Around Is Around and Now is the Time - National Film Board of Canada, Norman McLaren and Evelyn Lambart producers, Norman McLaren director, "in recognition of research in a new area of filmmaking."

References

Canadian
04
1952 in Canada